In basketball, points are the sum of the score accumulated through free throws or field goals. The Pro Basketball League (PBL) scoring title is awarded to the player with the highest points per game average in a given season.

Leaders

References
General

Ethias League seasons at Eurobasket.com

Specific

Scoring